An indirect presidential election (officially the 1st Federal Convention) was held on 12 September 1949, following the first Bundestag election of 14 August 1949 and coalition talks/ negotiations between CDU/CSU, FDP and German Party (DP).

The FDP leader Theodor Heuss, who was nominated by CDU/CSU and FDP by agreement of the partners of the ruling coalition, was elected by the Federal Convention (composed of all members of the Bundestag and an equal number of delegates selected by the state legislatures).

Under the 1949 Basic Law, the new office of the Federal President was given fewer powers than the preceding office of Reich President, due to the bad experiences of the past, especially the abuse of emergency powers. Heuss therefore assumed a largely ceremonial role. However, his duties included the nomination of the first Federal Chancellor, Konrad Adenauer. Federal President Heuss took the oath of office in front of Bundestag and Bundesrat the same day of his election, on 12 September 1949.

This was the first German presidential election in post-war Germany and the second indirect election since 1919 that elected Social Democrat Friedrich Ebert as Germany's first President. 

1949
1949 elections in Germany
September 1949 events in Europe
Theodor Heuss